Algheden is a village in western Eritrea. It is located in Forto District.

Nearby towns and villages include Bitama, Hawashayt, Adal, Ad Casub, Elit and Antalla.

External links
Satellite map at Maplandia.com

Villages in Eritrea